Sandra Dee Robinson, also sometimes credited as Sandra Robinson (born March 23, 1967), is an American actress, former beauty pageant contestant, and founder of the media training and consulting firm Charisma On Camera.

Early life and pageantry
Robinson was born Sandra Ferguson in Pittsburgh, Pennsylvania and grew up in the nearby suburb of Jefferson Hills. She began her career as a model by participating in beauty pageants. In her second major competition, she was named Miss Pennsylvania USA in March 1985. She then competed in Miss USA, the pageant to select the American entrant for the Miss Universe pageant, later that year.

Acting career
After her yearlong reign, Robinson began actively pursuing a career as an actress with intent to work in daytime drama. Her first, and most notable soap opera credit is her portrayal of Amanda Cory on Another World starting in August 1987. She left in 1993, returning in 1998 and remaining until the show's cancellation the following year.

In 1997, she temporarily replaced Katherine Kelly Lang as Brooke Logan on The Bold and the Beautiful while Lang was on maternity leave. Several months later, she played jewel thief, Jade Sheridan, on Sunset Beach.

In 2005, Robinson temporarily joined the cast of General Hospital as a recast Felicia Scorpio-Jones and 2008 saw her cast as Dr. Charlotte Taylor on NBC's Days of Our Lives.

Her projects away from daytime include episodes of the series Renegade and Silk Stalkings as well as an episode of the series Hot Line. Sandra has appeared in primetime shows such as Two and a Half Men, CSI, among others. She also worked on the web series The Bay.

Charisma On Camera
Along with speaking engagements, she is the founder and owner of the media training and consulting firm Charisma On Camera.

Personal life
Robinson has been married twice. Her first marriage was to John Reinhardt, whom she married while starring on Another World. During that time, she was credited in her early acting roles as Sandra Reinhardt. She went back to using her maiden name after their divorce. She married her second husband, stunt coordinator Allen Robinson, in 2005 and took his surname professionally.

Filmography

Film

Television

References

External links

Amanda Cory profile

American soap opera actresses
Miss USA 1980s delegates
Actresses from Pittsburgh
1967 births
Living people
21st-century American women